The 32nd Academy Awards ceremony was held on April 4, 1960 at the RKO Pantages Theatre, to honor the films of 1959.

William Wyler's Bible epic Ben-Hur won 11 Oscars, breaking the record of nine set the previous year by Gigi. This total was later tied by Titanic in 1997 and The Lord of the Rings: The Return of the King in 2003. Wyler became the third (and most recent) person to win more than two Best Director awards (following Frank Capra and John Ford), as well as the only person to date to direct three Best Picture winners (following Mrs. Miniver in 1942 and The Best Years of Our Lives in 1946).

A highlight of the ceremony came during the presentation of the award for Best Story and Screenplay Written Directly for the Screen: absent winner Stanley Shapiro (for Pillow Talk) had his co-winner, Maurice Richlin, ask presenter Tony Curtis to read his acceptance speech, which read, "I'm trapped downstairs in the gentleman's lounge. It seems I rented a faulty tuxedo. I'd like to thank you upstairs for this great honor." The audience roared in laughter.

Awards

Nominations announced on February 22, 1960. Winners are listed first and highlighted with boldface.

Academy Honorary Awards
Buster Keaton "for his unique talents which brought immortal comedies to the screen". (Statuette)
Lee De Forest "for his pioneering inventions which brought sound to the motion picture". (Statuette)

Jean Hersholt Humanitarian Award
Bob Hope

Presenters and performers

Presenters
Richard Conte and Angie Dickinson (Presenters: Art Direction Awards)
Gary Cooper (Presenter: Best Motion Picture)
Tony Curtis and Janet Leigh (Presenters: Writing Awards)
Edward Curtiss (Presenter: Cinematography Awards)
Arlene Dahl and Fernando Lamas (Presenters: Costume Design Awards)
Doris Day (Presenter: Best Original Song)
Olivia de Havilland (Presenters: Best Supporting Actor)
Edmond O'Brien (Presenters: Best Supporting Actress)
Mitzi Gaynor (Presenter: Documentary Awards)
Haya Harareet (Presenter: Best Special Effects)
Susan Hayward (Presenter: Best Actor)
Rock Hudson (Presenter: Best Actress)
Eric Johnston (Presenter: Best Foreign Language Film)
B. B. Kahane (Presenter: Jean Hersholt Humanitarian Award)
Gene Kelly (Presenter: Music Awards)
Hope Lange and Carl Reiner (Presenters: Short Subjects Awards)
Barbara Rush (Presenter: Best Film Editing)
Robert Wagner and Natalie Wood (Presenters: Best Sound Recording)
John Wayne (Presenter: Best Director)

Performers
Sammy Davis Jr. ("High Hopes" from A Hole in the Head)
Gogi Grant ("Strange Are the Ways of Love" from The Young Land)
Joni James ("The Five Pennies" from The Five Pennies)
Frankie Laine ("The Hanging Tree" from The Hanging Tree)
Frankie Vaughan ("The Best of Everything" from The Best of Everything)

Multiple nominations and awards

These films had multiple nominations:

12 nominations: Ben-Hur
8 nominations: The Diary of Anne Frank and The Nun's Story
7 nominations: Anatomy of a Murder
6 nominations: Room at the Top and Some Like It Hot
5 nominations: Pillow Talk
4 nominations: The Five Pennies, Porgy and Bess
3 nominations: The Big Fisherman; Career; Journey to the Center of the Earth; North by Northwest; Suddenly, Last Summer and The Young Philadelphians
2 nominations: The Best of Everything, Imitation of Life, The Last Angry Man and On the Beach

The following films received multiple awards.

11 wins: Ben-Hur
3 wins: The Diary of Anne Frank
2 wins: Room at the Top

See also
17th Golden Globe Awards
1959 in film
 2nd Grammy Awards
 11th Primetime Emmy Awards
 12th Primetime Emmy Awards
 13th British Academy Film Awards
 14th Tony Awards

References

Academy Awards ceremonies
1959 film awards
1959 awards in the United States
1960 in Los Angeles
1960 in American cinema
April 1960 events in the United States